

See also
Table of United States Metropolitan Statistical Areas
Table of United States Combined Statistical Areas

 
Tennessee